Givry is a village of Wallonia and a district of the  municipality of Quévy, located in the province of Hainaut, Belgium.

Notes

References
 

Former municipalities of Hainaut (province)